The Kite Mansion, also known as the Kite House, is a historic home located in Elkton, Rockingham County, Virginia. It was built in 1948, and consists of a two-story, five-bay, central-passage plan main block with flanking one-story wings in the Colonial Revival style.  It is constructed of concrete block and clad in running bond brick.  The front facade features a Classical Revival style, pedimented, two-story portico.  Also on the property is a contributing greenhouse.

It was listed on the National Register of Historic Places in 2007.

References

Houses on the National Register of Historic Places in Virginia
Colonial Revival architecture in Virginia
Houses completed in 1948
Houses in Rockingham County, Virginia
National Register of Historic Places in Rockingham County, Virginia
U.S. Route 33